Kuç is a settlement in the Vlorë County, southwestern Albania. At the 2015 local government reform it became part of the municipality Himarë.

Demographics 
Kuç is fully inhabited by Albanians who speak the Albanian dialect of Labërishte.

History
In 1847 Kuç took part in a rebellion against the Ottoman Empire.
Kuç inhabitants have expressed Albanian nationalist sentiments and during the Balkan War in 1912 Greek troops burned down the village and other settlements nearby. During the interwar period (20th century) Kuç was in feud with nearby Greek speaking villages to its south of the Himarë area.

Notable people
Zenel Gjoleka : Albanian Rebel Leader and Hero.

References 

Populated places in Himara
Villages in Vlorë County
Labëria